Robert Salter may refer to:
 Robert B. Salter (1924–2010), Canadian surgeon
 Robert M. Salter (1920–2011), RAND Corporation engineer

See also
Robert Slater (disambiguation)